Blue Ball is a community in Butler and Warren counties, in the U.S. state of Ohio. The community was established in 1820 at the intersection of the Dixie Highway (later U.S. Route 25). Blue Ball was annexed by nearby Middletown in 1994.

Blue Ball was so named because that image appeared on its tavern's signboard for the benefit of the illiterate.

References

Middletown, Ohio
Geography of Butler County, Ohio
Geography of Warren County, Ohio
Neighborhoods in Ohio
1820 establishments in Ohio
Populated places established in 1820